Sheykh Hatam (also Romanized as Sheykh Ḩātam; also known as Beyt-e Ḩātam-e Bozorg) is a village in Seyyed Abbas Rural District, Shavur District, Shush County, Khuzestan Province, Iran. At the 2006 census, its population was 599, in 81 families.

References 

Populated places in Shush County